The Journal of Clinical Psychiatry is a peer-reviewed medical journal that covers clinical psychiatry, especially depression, bipolar disorder, schizophrenia, anxiety, addiction, and attention-deficit/hyperactivity disorder, as well as several other mental disorders. It is the official journal of the American Society for Clinical Psychopharmacology and was established in 1940 as Diseases of the Nervous System, before obtaining its current name in 1979.

Most subscribers receive the journal free of charge if they are designated as psychiatric clinicians in provider databases such as the American Medical Association's masterfile.

The journal occasionally publishes sponsored supplements. Although these supplements may be perceived as more biased by commercial interests, and are subjected to a different peer review process than articles in the journal proper, they nevertheless have a comparable number of citations.

Abstracting and indexing 
The journal is abstracted and indexed in:

According to the Journal Citation Reports, the journal has a 2021 impact factor of 5.906.

See also
 List of psychiatry journals

References

External links 
 

Psychiatry journals
Publications established in 1940
Monthly journals
English-language journals